Horace Raymond Wright (6 September 1918 – August 1987) was an English professional footballer who played as an inside forward. He started his career with Wolverhampton Wanderers, making eight appearances before the outbreak of World War II. Wright joined Exeter City when competitive football resumed after the war. He spent two seasons at the club before joining Yeovil Town.

References

1918 births
1987 deaths
English footballers
Association football inside forwards
Wolverhampton Wanderers F.C. players
Exeter City F.C. players
Yeovil Town F.C. players
English Football League players